A lift ticket or lift pass is an identifier usually attached to a skier's or snowboarder's outerwear that indicates they have paid and can ride on the ski lift(s) that transport people and equipment up or down a mountain.

Types of lift tickets
Types of lift tickets may vary by specific number of rides, time period (half day, day, night, multi-day, season), or type of lift.

Direct application to clothing 
Before ticket wickets, zip-ties, and RFID cards, lift tickets were stapled or glued directly to clothing, to prevent ticket holders from transferring lift tickets from one skier to another, thereby depriving ski resorts of revenue. This approach, however, damaged skiers' clothing.

Ticket wicket
Ski resorts (and other venues that issue tickets) commonly use a wicket to secure the ticket (called a "ticket wicket"), a short piece of light wire which loops through the ticket holder's clothing or backpack. The ticket wicket was invented by Killington Ski Resort employee Martin S. "Charlie" Hanley, in 1963, and given its name by his wife Jane. Hanley patented the ticket wicket in Canada and the United States in 1966, and assigned the rights to Killington's parent company, The Sherburne Corporation, for whom he had developed the wicket while on their payroll. The Sherbourne Corporation licensed the ticket wicket to ski areas across the U.S. following a ski operators road show, at which the Hanleys promoted it. Despite quick and widespread adoption of the wicket both domestically and abroad, however, Hanley never made any money off the soon-ubiquitous ticket wicket; an avid skier, he was content to invent something that further developed the then-nascent sport of downhill skiing. In 1995, John C. Myles, Melisa Syracusa, and Edward M. Friedlander Jr. patented another version of the ticket wicket.

The wicket inspired several innovations to make its use more convenient, such as ski ticket holder "pigtail". In addition, many ski jackets are designed with wickets in mind, providing plastic or cloth loops that allow the attachment of a wicket without interfering with zipper operation.

Zip-tie
Today, although ticket wickets are still widely used, some resorts now use plastic zip-ties rather than metal wires to secure tickets. As Greg Morrill notes, "The zip-ties made it easier to remove the ticket, but the zip-tie remained.  I still see quite a few skiers with a collection of ticket-less zip-ties hooked to their parka." The difficulty removing zip ties from clothing is but one issue those plastic fasteners fail to resolve; another is: "For ski areas there was the problem of checking tickets.  Historically this was a manual process performed by lift personnel.  But as the number of skiers increased, staff had to be added expressly to check tickets. Part of this need was also driven by the fact that as ticket prices went up there was more incentive for customers to rip-off the system." Manually checking tickets is complicated by the popular practice of skiers Morrill refers to as "Ticket Turkeys", who retain a collection of used ski tickets on their clothing, thereby forcing human ticket checkers "to parse through a collection of tickets to find the current one."

RFID card
Some ski resorts have overcome the above-mentioned problems by issuing, instead of lift tickets, digital cards embedded with RFID chips. These cards are kept in a pocket during the skier's visit to the resort, as they do not need to be removed for the access gate to detect them. 

History

The invention of the electronic ski pass is thanks to an Italian company, ALFI of Borgo Ticino (NO), which in 1974 supplied the first electronic access control system in the world for ski lifts in San Vigilio di Marebbe (Italy). The following year this solution was extended to the entire "newborn" Dolomiti Superski (Italy)

In 1999 ALFI supplied the first RFID ISO 15693 electronic ski pass system to the French resort of Plan Joux (France).

In April 2018, the first totally dematerialized ski pass solution in the world was presented, using smartphones instead of the classic RFID cards, by the Italian company BLUETICKETING of Pont Saint Martin (AO).

References

Skiing
Tickets